Bit Boy!! Arcade is an action video game developed by Austrian indie studio Bplus for Nintendo 3DS' eShop service. It was released in the United States on April 17, 2014 and in Europe on April 24, 2014. It's a sequel to the 2009 released Bit Boy!! for Nintendo's WiiWare service and the second installment of the Bit Boy!! series.
It uses a 3D, isometric playing field, with polygon characters.
According to Bplus two more sequels will be released in undefined future.

Gameplay
The game follows the principle of rescuing Kubi's friends and avoid monsters that roam the levels. 
The main goal in each phase, each level consists of 10 normal and 10 action phases, is to rescue seven of Kubis friends.

The publisher denotes the game with the terms "Hide + Seek", "Avoid + Collect" and "Action + Puzzle". 
Each level is based on a square floor plan. On this grid-like basis Kubi is moved. The camera is oriented isometric. 
The players define how fast Kubi is moving by pressing the control pad and the buttons at the same time. Depending on how fast they are pressed Kubi moves fast or slow.
The game uses the 3DS featured play coins to give the player the ability to purchase continues like it would be in a real arcade machine.

Plot

Characters
ZeLeLi is a mighty gearwheel-shaped being created out of the essence of our dying sun 7 billion years in the future. ZeLeLi is the origin of time, life and light so it possesses power over these universal forces. Travelling through time and space, ZeLeLi spreads the seed of life and light in all time in the whole universe. 
Its counterpart are the black Shadow Plättchen. Forcefully cut out of the negative space of a black hole, the black Shadow Plättchen represent exactly the opposite of ZeLeLi. Like the ZeLeLi, Plättchen are not limited within the constrains of time and space.
Wherever they come along they spread massive havoc.  
Central to the plot of the game are two main characters, the games hero Kubi and the game designer Bernd. He appears as a through the air floating pixel head and talks to Kubi during the games sequences.

Story
At the beginning of the game Kubi gets killed by a monster created from the black Shadow Plättchen. Bernd is devastated and pleads ZeLeLi for help. ZeLeLi turns back the time and gives Kubi and Bernd the ability to speak to each other. In the meantime Bernd deleted the game in which Kubi died to create another one in whom his hero doesn't have to suffer this fate. Kubi thinks that Bernd is the one who has kidnaped all of his friends and refuses to be the hero unless Bernd designs the game exactly like Kubi wants it to be. As the story continues it is hinted that Bernd even if he is the developer of the game is not almighty. The Shadow Plättchen gained power by killing small fairies called Pixel Flies and by kidnaping their king. With this power they got the ability to take influence on the game. So Kubi and Bernd are forced to work together to save Kubis friends and the game itself.

Development
Bit Boy!! Arcade was produced by Bplus. The first announcement was made via press release on 16 February 2012 stating that the game was halfway done. A first playable demo was shown at E3 2012.

Reception

The game received mixed reviews, ending up with a Metacritic score of 53. Nintendo Life praised the overworld, saying it was one of the most interesting on the gaming history and also said it had an excellent soundtrack, but criticized the gameplay was broken and it was hard to play.

References

External links
Official website
Official Nintendo website

2014 video games
Action video games
Video game sequels
Nintendo 3DS games
Nintendo 3DS eShop games
Nintendo 3DS-only games
Video games developed in Austria